Terry Williams is an American politician from the state of Vermont who will represent the Rutland County district in the Vermont Senate from January 2023. A member of the Republican Party, he previously served as a member of the Poultney Board of Selectmen and unsuccessfully ran for the same district in 2020.

References

Living people
Republican Party Vermont state senators
21st-century American politicians
Year of birth missing (living people)
Place of birth missing (living people)